is a vertically scrolling shooter released by Konami as an arcade video game in 1985 in Japan. Along with Sega's Fantasy Zone, released a year later, TwinBee is credited as an early archetype of the "cute 'em up" type in its genre. It was the first game to run on Konami's Bubble System hardware. TwinBee was ported to the Family Computer and MSX in 1986 and has been included in numerous compilations released in later years. The original arcade game was released outside Japan for the first time in the Nintendo DS compilation Konami Classics Series: Arcade Hits. A mobile phone version was released for i-mode Japan phones in 2003 with edited graphics.

Various TwinBee sequels were released for the arcade and home console markets following the original game, some which spawned audio drama and anime adaptations in Japan.

Gameplay
TwinBee can be played by up to 2-players simultaneously. The player takes control of a cartoon-like anthropomorphic spacecraft, with Player 1 taking control of TwinBee, the titular ship, while Player 2 controls WinBee. The game control consists of an eight-way joystick and two buttons: one for shooting enemies in the air and the other for dropping bombs to ground enemies (similarly to Xevious).

The player's primary power-ups are bells that can be uncovered by shooting at the floating clouds where they're hidden. If the player continues shooting the bell after it appears, it will change into one of four other colors: the regular yellow bells only grant bonus points, the white bell will upgrade the player's gun into a twin cannon, the blue bell increases the player's speed (for up to five speed levels), the green bell will allow the player to create image copies of its ship for additional firepower, and the red bell will provide the player's ship a barrier that allows it to sustain more damage. The green and red bells cannot be combined. Other power-ups can also be retrieved from ground enemies such as an alternate bell that gives the player's ship a three-way gun, a star which eliminates all on-screen enemies.

As with other games of the same genre, getting shot by a single enemy bullet will cause the player to lose a life. However, if the bullet only strikes either side of the ship instead, the player's ship will only lose one of its arms. If the player's ship loses both arms, it will lose the ability to throw bombs and the player must wait for an ambulance to arrive. The player must navigate their ship to the ambulance to repair their arms. However, if the player's ship loses both arms for the second time, no ambulance will arrive.

If two players are playing at the same time, they can align their ships vertically or horizontally together to perform more powerful attacks.

Ports
TwinBee originally appeared as an arcade game. It was later ported to MSX and the Family Computer. The Famicom version was re-released only in Japan under the Famicom Mini label for the Game Boy Advance. This game was officially released for the first time outside Japan as part of the Konami Classics Series: Arcade Hits for the Nintendo DS in March 2007, under the name RainbowBell in North America, although the TwinBee name was restored for the European release. TwinBee was released in Japan on August 10, 2011, and in other regions on September 22, 2011, for the Nintendo 3DS as a part of the 3D Classics series. This release was featured amongst other games from the Nintendo Entertainment System and Super NES to be released for the 3DS on a tech demo called Classic Games at E3 2010. The arcade version of TwinBee was made available on Microsoft's Game Room service for its Xbox 360 console and for Windows-based PCs on December 1, 2010. Also, the MSX version was re-released for Windows' EGG Project on August 19, 2014. The arcade original version was available via the Arcade Archives series published by Hamster Corporation on Christmas 2015 for the PlayStation 4 in Japan and on December 5, 2019 for the Nintendo Switch worldwide. An NES port was re-released via the Nintendo Switch Online service on November 14, 2018, worldwide, with an SP version titled TwinBee: A second helping of Donburi Island! released on June 12, 2019.

Reception 
In Japan, Game Machine listed TwinBee on their April 1, 1985 issue as being the third most-successful table arcade unit of the month.

The version ofTwinbee for Nintendo 3DS received a total of 68/100 on Metacritic, which is mixed to positive, with an average user score of 6.8.

References

External links
Twinbee World
i-mode Release

 
1985 video games
Arcade video games
D4 Enterprise games
Famicom Disk System games
Game Boy Advance games
MSX games
Nintendo 3DS eShop games
Nintendo Entertainment System games
X68000 games
Mobile games
TwinBee games
Video games developed in Japan
Virtual Console games
Virtual Console games for Wii U
Windows games
Xbox 360 games
PlayStation 4 games
Nintendo Switch Online games
Hamster Corporation games
Multiplayer and single-player video games